Premios Juventud (Youth Awards) is an awards show for Spanish-speaking celebrities in the areas of film, music, sports, fashion, and pop culture, presented by the television network Univision. Winners are determined by online vote at univision.com.

Premios Juventud is set apart by their unique categories, including "Me muero sin ese CD" (Album I can't live without), "Mi concierto favorito" (My favorite concert), and "La más pegajosa" (Catchiest song).
Past winners have included people such as Ricky Martin, Shakira, Prince Royce, Juanes, Enrique Iglesias, Daddy Yankee, Thalía, RBD, Romeo Santos, Antonio Banderas, Maná, Jennifer Lopez, Gloria Trevi and Fifth Harmony.

Editions
The first two editions were held in September. In 2006 it was moved up to July. From 2004 to 2017 the show aired on a Thursday. The 2018 edition has been the only edition to be held on a Sunday and to not have nominees and voting. With the 2019 edition, the show moved back to a Thursday and nominees and voting returned.

See also

 Latin American television awards

References

External links
Official Premios Juventud website—

 
Awards honoring Hispanic and Latino Americans
Latin American awards
Latin American film awards
Latin American music awards
Latin American television awards
North American sports trophies and awards
American music awards
Caribbean awards
North American awards
South American awards
Univision original programming
Awards established in 2004